Sedatus (Latin: SEDATVS) was a guardian deity (genius) of the Breuci and the Latobici. Originally Celtic, Sedatus is known to have been worshipped during the Roman Empire as late as the 2nd-century AD as indicated by a votive stone dedicated to this god by the First Cohort of the Breuci. 

Sedatus may have been the namesake of the Sedatii, a Gallo-Roman family active in the mid 2nd-century AD.

Inscriptions

References

Bibliography
August Dimitz, History of Carniola: From Ancient times to the year 1813, vol. I p.15 and 55

Gaulish gods